Alpha is an unincorporated community in Lane County, in the U.S. state of Oregon.

History
A post office was established at Alpha in 1890, and remained in operation until it was discontinued in 1940. The community was named for Alpha Lundey, a local girl.

See also
Deadwood, Oregon, for information about Alpha Farm, named for the former post office

References

Unincorporated communities in Lane County, Oregon
Unincorporated communities in Oregon